The Central District of Ashtian County is a district (bakhsh) in Ashtian County, Markazi Province, Iran. At the 2006 census, its population was 19,011, in 5,669 families.  The District has one city: Ashtian. The District has three rural districts (dehestan): Garakan Rural District, Mazraeh Now Rural District, and Siyavashan Rural District.

References 

Ashtian County
Districts of Markazi Province